The Ghent system is the name given to an arrangement in some countries whereby the main responsibility for welfare payments, especially unemployment benefits, is held by trade unions rather than a government agency. The system is named after the city of Ghent, Belgium, where it was first implemented. It is the predominant form of unemployment benefit in Denmark, Finland, Iceland and Sweden. Belgium has a hybrid or "quasi-Ghent" system, in which the government also plays a significant role in distributing benefits. In all of the above countries, unemployment funds held by unions or labour federations are regulated and/or partly subsidised by the national government concerned.

Because workers in many cases need to belong to a union to receive benefits, union membership is higher in countries with the Ghent system. Furthermore, the state benefit is a fixed sum, but the benefits from unemployment funds depend on previous earnings.

Ghent system in Sweden 
From January 2007, the Swedish state decreased its financial support to the unemployment funds (most of them union-run, a few funds aimed for small entrepreneurs and one independent fund), with the result being that membership fees to unemployment funds had to be raised considerably, and union density declined from 77% in 2006 to 71% in 2008. In January 2014 the fund fees were restored to about the same level as before 2007. In 2015 Swedish union density was 69% and the density of union unemployment funds 73% (75% if the independent Alfa fund is added).

Ghent system in Czechoslovakia 
Ghent system in Czechoslovakia was adopted in 1925 mainly thanks to social democrats. It was largely opposed by the communist trade unions due to restrictions in work of communist red unions.

Notes

References

 Petri Böckerman & Roope Uusitalo (2006). "Erosion of the Ghent System and Union Membership Decline: Lessons from Finland." British Journal of Industrial Relations, 44:2, 283–303.
 Kjellberg, Anders (2009) "The Swedish Ghent system and trade unions under pressure" Transfer no 3-4 2009 (pp. 481–504). ISSN 1024-2589
 Kjellberg, Anders (2006) "The Swedish unemployment insurance - will the Ghent system survive?", Transfer no 1 2006 (pp. 87–98). ISSN 1024-2589
 Kjellberg, Anders and Ibsen, Christian Lyhne (2016) "Attacks on union organizing:  Reversible and irreversible changes to the Ghent-systems in Sweden and Denmark" in Trine Pernille Larsen and Anna Ilsøe (eds.)(2016) Den Danske Model set udefra (The Danish Model Inside Out) - komparative perspektiver på dansk arbejdsmarkedsregulering, Copenhagen: Jurist- og Økonomforbundets Forlag (pp. 279–302)
 Aleksi Kuusisto (2005), "Independent unemployment insurance fund 'undermining unions'" European Industrial Relations Observatory On-Line (October 24, 2005)
 Jens Lind (2007), "A Nordic saga? The Ghent system and trade unions" International Journal of Employment Studies (January 4, 2007)
 Lyle Scruggs (2001), "The Ghent System and Union Membership in Europe, 1970-1996", University of Connecticut Website.

Ghent
Trade unions
Social programs
Welfare economics
Labour law